Will Allen may refer to:

Will Allen (safety) (born 1982), American football safety for the Pittsburgh Steelers
Will Allen (cornerback) (born 1978), American football cornerback
Will Allen (urban farmer) (born 1949), American basketball player and director of the Growing Power urban farming program

See also
William Allen (disambiguation)
Willie Allen (disambiguation)
Bill Allen (disambiguation)
William Allan (disambiguation)
William Van Alen (1883–1954), American architect
Allen (surname)